Andrew James Brassington (born 9 August 1954, at Bagnall, Staffordshire) is a former cricketer who played first-class cricket over 15 seasons for Gloucestershire from 1974 to 1988.

A lower-order right-handed batsman and a wicketkeeper, Brassington was a regular in the Gloucestershire first-class side between 1978 and 1982, but played less frequently in one-day matches because Andy Stovold was a far better batsman and an adequate wicketkeeper. He played seldom after 1982 because of the emergence of Jack Russell as a wicketkeeper-batsman.

References

1954 births
Living people
English cricketers
Gloucestershire cricketers